Peechay Tou Dekho is a Pakistani horror-comedy film. It is written and directed by Syed Atif Ali, co-written by Mounam Majeed, and edited by Salman Tehzeeb. The film features Yasir Hussain and Sarah Khan. It was released on 17,June 2022.

Plot 
Peechay Tou Dekho is a horror comedy revolving around two friends who out of curiosity visit a haunted house and encounter a lady witch played by Waqar Hussain, who lives with two girls.

Cast 
 Yasir Hussain
 Aadi Adyeal Amjad
 Waqar Hussain
 Sarah Ali Khan
 Junaid Akhter,
 Aamir Qureshi
 Malik Raza
 Sharique Mehmood
 Asghar Khoso
 Yasir Taj
 Nawal Saeed
 Hammad Siddiqui

Production 
Peechay Tou Dekho was filmed in Karachi. Yasir Hussain confirmed that the film was shot in Karachi. The director Syed Atif also confirmed the shooting areas. The film was shot in various parts in Karachi. Eveready Pictures and Screenshots Productions are the production companies.

There are five songs in the film. Four of them are composed by A.Q Artisan, written by Shamim Bazil and sung by Misaal Zaidi, Martina and A.Q Artisan and one song is written, composed and produced by Noman Jalal.

Reception 
Faisal Ali from PAKcenima reviewed it as: It attempts to offer a unique horror-comedy experience with strictly middling results.

References

External links 
 

2022 films
2022 action comedy films
2020s Urdu-language films
Pakistani action comedy-drama films
Films shot in Karachi
Pakistani horror films
Urdu-language Pakistani films